The 1976 Football Championship of Ukrainian SSR was the 46th season of association football competition of the Ukrainian SSR, which was part of the Soviet Second League in Zone 6. The season started on 3 April 1976.

The 1976 Football Championship of Ukrainian SSR was won by FC Kryvbas Kryvyi Rih.

The "Ruby Cup" of Molod Ukrayiny newspaper (for the most scored goals) was received by FC Kryvbas Kryvyi Rih.

Teams

Location map

Relegated teams 
 FC Metalist Kharkiv – (returning after a season)

Promoted teams 
 FC Kolos Nikopol – (debut)
 FC Shakhtar Horlivka – (returning after three seasons)

Relocated and renamed teams 
 FC Tiraspol was moved back to Odessa and changed its name to SKA Odessa.
 FC Dynamo Khmelnytskyi changed its name to FC Khvylya Khmelnytskyi.
 FC Lokomotyv Kherson changed its name to FC Krystal Kherson.
 FC Khvylya Sevastopol changed its name to FC Atlantyka Sevastopol.
 FC Lokomotyv Zhdanov changed its name to FC Novator Zhdanov.

Final standings

Top goalscorers 
The following were the top goalscorers.

See also 
 Soviet Second League

Notes

References

External links 
 1976 Soviet Second League, Zone 2 (Ukrainian SSR football championship). Luhansk football portal
 1976 Soviet championships (all leagues) at helmsoccer.narod.ru

1976
3
Soviet
Soviet
football
Football Championship of the Ukrainian SSR